Sheung Shui Wai, also known as Sheung Shui Heung is an area in Sheung Shui, in the northern part of the New Territories of Hong Kong. Its population is around 6,000 people.

Administration
For electoral purposes, Sheung Shui Wai is part of the Fung Tsui constituency of the North District Council. It was formerly represented by Chiang Man-ching, who was elected in the local elections until July 2021.

Villages

Sheung Shui Heung consists of the following villages:
 Wai Loi Tsuen. See details below
 Man Kok Village
 Ha Pak Tsuen
 Sheung Pak Tsuen
 Chung Sum Tsuen
 Tai Yuen Tsuen
 Hing Yan Tsuen
 Po Sheung Tsuen
 Mun Hau Tsuen

History

The area is the core of the Liu clan, of which ancestors came originally from Fujian during the Yuan Dynasty (1271–1368). It is widely believed that the Liu clan began to settle in this part of the New Territories at the end of the 16th century.

Wai Loi Tsuen is the area's original settlement, with its construction completed around 1584. In 1688, the size of the clan was approximately 500. As the population grew, other settlements were added: Po Sheung Tsuen, Chung Sum Tsuen and Mun Hau Tsuen were founded between 1819 and 1898. The villages are collectively named "Sheung Shui Heung".

Sights

Wai Loi Tsuen

Wai Loi Tsuen is a walled village. It is the area's original settlement, with its construction completed around 1584. It is one of the very few rural settlements having retained its original moat. The wall and the moat around Wai Loi Tsuen were constructed between 1646 and 1647. The village contains a Tin Hau and a Hung Shing temples. Both have been renovated to modern structures.

Liu Man Shek Tong Ancestral Hall

The Liu Man Shek Tong Ancestral Hall in Mun Hau Tsuen was built in 1751. The three-hall two-courtyard building is the main ancestral hall of the Liu of the area. It is a declared monument since January 18, 1985.

Liu Ming Tak Tong Ancestral Hall
Liu Ming Tak Tong Ancestral Hall, located in Po Sheung Tsuen, was first built in 1811 or 1828. The building was demolished in 1972 and reconstructed in 1973, with only a granite door frame remaining from the original hall.

Liu Ying Lung Study Hall
The Liu Ying Lung Study Hall, located at Po Sheung Tsuen, was built in 1838. It is a traditional two-hall study hall with an open courtyard in between. It is a Grade II Historic Building. A restoration project was conducted ahead of the once-in-60-year dajiao festival held in 2006. The project won an Honourable Mention in the 2006 UNESCO Asia-Pacific Heritage Awards for Culture Heritage Conservation.

Old Sheung Shui Police Station

The Old Sheung Shui Police Station (舊上水警署), located in Po Sheung Tsuen, was built in 1902. When the new Sheung Shui Police Station opened in 1979, the old station became a police reporting centre, and later housed a Junior Police Corps (JPC) Club House. It is a Grade III historic building.

References

External links

 Delineation of area of existing village Sheung Shui Heung (Sheung Shui) for election of resident representative (2019 to 2022)
 Location map of Sheung Shui and Sheung Shui Wai (see C9)
 Liu Man Shek Tong Ancestral Hall (4 parts):  
 Antiquities and Monuments Office. Hong Kong Traditional Chinese Architectural Information System. Chung Sum Tsuen
 Antiquities and Monuments Office. Hong Kong Traditional Chinese Architectural Information System. Ha Pak Tsuen
 Antiquities and Monuments Office. Hong Kong Traditional Chinese Architectural Information System. Hing Yan Tsuen
 Antiquities and Monuments Office. Hong Kong Traditional Chinese Architectural Information System. Mun Hau Tsuen
 Antiquities and Monuments Office. Hong Kong Traditional Chinese Architectural Information System. Po Sheung Tsuen
 Antiquities and Monuments Office. Hong Kong Traditional Chinese Architectural Information System. Sheung Pak Tsuen
 Antiquities and Monuments Office. Hong Kong Traditional Chinese Architectural Information System. Tai Yuen Tsuen
 Antiquities and Monuments Office. Hong Kong Traditional Chinese Architectural Information System. Wai Loi Tsuen
 Map of Wai Loi Tsuen

Walled villages of Hong Kong
Sheung Shui
Villages in North District, Hong Kong